The First Lady of the United States Jill Biden has received numerous honors in recognition of her career in education and politics. These include:

Scholastic

 Chancellor, visitor, governor, rector and fellowships

Honorary degrees

Awards

References

Honors
Lists of awards received by person
Jill Biden